Smash the House is a record label founded in 2010 by Belgian electronic music DJ and record producer duo Dimitri Vegas & Like Mike. It is the home to many artists such as Bassjackers, Wolfpack and Ummet Ozcan.

Smash The House was distributed by Spinnin' Records from 2011 to 2013. Since 2013 until 2017, the label was distributed by Armada Music.

Sublabels 
 Generation Smash.

 Smash Deep.
Smash Classics.
Green Room. run by Like Mike
 House Of House. run by Dimitri Vegas
 Alteza. run by Vini Vici

Artists 

 Atika Patum
 Bassjackers
 Basto
 Blasterjaxx
 BOOSTEDKIDS
 Chuckie
 D'Angello & Francis
 Dimitri Vegas & Like Mike
 Felguk     
 Futuristic Polar Bears
 Hardwell
 KSHMR
 Nicky Romero
 Quintino
 Nervo
 Regi
 REGGIO
 Sandro Silva
 Steve Aoki
 Sidney Samson
 Sylver
 Thomas Newson
 Timmy Trumpet
 Tony Junior
 twoloud
 Ummet Ozcan
 Vini Vici
 W&W
 Wolfpack
 Yves V
 Jean Marie

References

External links 
 

Belgian record labels
Electronic dance music record labels
Record labels established in 2010
Willebroek